The Dongnaeeupseong Fortress is located on Dongnae-gu, Busan Metropolitan City, Republic of Korea.

Traditionally in Korea, a wall-fortress was erected in each town to keep it safe from invasions. In this area called Dongnae, there were some borough-states after the Samhan period (the 1st century BC), Geochilsanguk, Chilsanguk, Jangsanguk and Dongnoguk states are told to have been included among these. It is believed that walls had been already built here at that time.

However, the first mention about the Dongnaeeupseong Fortress that appears in historical records is that the wall was repaired in 1021, the twelfth year of the reign of King Hyeonjong of Goryeo Dynasty.

Since the Japanese began their invasions into Korea on April 14, 1592, this Dongnaeeupseong Fortress, along with the Busanjinseong Fortress, became the first target by the Japanese. Siege of Dongnae ensued here, in which General Song Sang-hyeon and all the other officials, troops and common people lost their lives.

It had four gates: Jihuiru (east), Simseongnu (west), Muuru (south), and Eunillu (north). A wing fortress was built upon the south gate and small fortifications were erected on the other three gates too. At present, there are some restored structures inside the wall, including the north gate with a fortification on its top, Dongjangdae and Seojangdae, and Bukjangdae, Insaengmun (Gate), Chiseong wall and a fortified small wall surrounding a gate.

References

Tourist attractions in Busan
Castles in South Korea
Culture of Busan
City walls in South Korea
Buildings and structures in Busan